Eskil Edh (born 4 August 2002) is a Norwegian football midfielder who plays for Lillestrøm SK.

He played youth football for Lillestrøm SK, except for the year 2017 in which he was with Skjetten SK. He made his senior debut for Lillestrøm in September 2020 against Kongsvinger. He officially signed a contract and became a part of the senior squad in November 2020. He made his Eliteserien debut in May 2021 against Viking. In the same year he made his debut as a Norway youth international.

References

2002 births
Living people
People from Skedsmo
Norwegian footballers
Norway youth international footballers
Lillestrøm SK players
Norwegian First Division players
Eliteserien players
Association football midfielders
Sportspeople from Viken (county)